Sarfraz is a male Muslim given name as well as a surname. It can refer to:

As given name 
Sarfaraz Ahmed a Pakistani cricketer
Sarfraz Ali (born 1977), convicted of the racially motivated murder of Ross Parker
Sarfaraz Khan, a Nawab of Bengal from the Nasiri dynasty.
Sarfaraz Khan, an Indian cricketer
Sarfraz Ahmed Naeemi, Pakistani cleric
Sarfraz Nawaz a former Pakistani cricketer
Sarfraz Rafiqui a Pakistani pilot
Sarfraz Rasool a Pakistani footballer
 Sarfraz Singh Aujla

As surname 
Akhtar Sarfraz a Pakistani cricketer

Surnames